is a Japanese fashion model represented by LesPros entertainment. Her father was 58th sumo grand champion Chiyonofuji Mitsugu.

Filmography

TV series

Radio series

Magazines

Music videos

Advertisements

Internet

References

External links
 
 
 

Japanese female models
1987 births
Living people
People from Tokyo